The women's curling tournament at the 2017 Asian Winter Games was held in Sapporo, Japan between 18–24 February at Sapporo Curling Stadium. Curling returns to the competition schedule after missing out at the last edition of the games in 2011.

A total of five teams contested the women's curling competition.

Squads

Results
All times are Japan Standard Time (UTC+09:00)

Round robin

18 February, 13:30

19 February, 9:00

20 February, 9:00

20 February, 18:00

21 February, 13:30

Final round

Semifinals
22 February, 18:00

Bronze medal game
23 February, 18:00

Gold medal game
24 February, 18:00

References

External links
Results

Women's tournament